The Tribunal of the Holy Office of the Inquisition, commonly known as the Spanish Inquisition, was established in 1478 by the Catholic Monarchs, King Ferdinand II of Aragon and Queen Isabella I of Castile. It began toward the end of the Reconquista and was intended to maintain Catholic orthodoxy in their kingdoms and to replace the Medieval Inquisition, which was under Papal control. It became the most substantive of the three different manifestations of the wider Catholic Inquisition along with the Roman Inquisition and Portuguese Inquisition. The "Spanish Inquisition" may be defined broadly as operating in Spain and in all Spanish colonies and territories, which included the Canary Islands, the Kingdom of Naples, and all Spanish possessions in North America and South America. According to modern estimates, around 150,000 people were prosecuted for various offences during the three-century duration of the Spanish Inquisition, of whom between 3,000 and 5,000 were executed, approximately 2.7% of all cases. The Inquisition, however, since the creation of the American courts, never had jurisdiction over the Indians. The King of Spain ordered "that the inquisitors should never proceed against the Indians, but against the old Christians and their descendants and other persons against whom in these kingdoms of Spain it is customary to proceed".

The Inquisition was originally intended primarily to identify heretics among those who converted from Judaism and Islam to Catholicism. The regulation of the faith of newly converted Catholics was intensified following the royal decrees issued in 1492 and 1502 ordering Jews and Muslims to convert to Catholicism or leave Castile, resulting in hundreds of thousands of forced conversions, the persecution of conversos and moriscos, and the mass expulsions of Jews and of Muslims from Spain. The Inquisition was abolished in 1834, during the reign of Isabella II, after a period of declining influence in the preceding century.

Previous Inquisitions

The Inquisition was created through papal bull, Ad Abolendam, issued at the end of the 12th century by Pope Lucius III to combat the Albigensian heresy in southern France. There were a large number of tribunals of the Papal Inquisition in various European kingdoms during the Middle Ages through different diplomatic and political means. In the Kingdom of Aragon, a tribunal of the Papal Inquisition was established by the statute of Excommunicamus of Pope Gregory IX, in 1232, during the era of the Albigensian heresy, as a condition for peace with Aragon. The Inquisition was ill-received by the Aragonese, which led to prohibitions against insults or attacks on it. Rome was particularly concerned that the Iberian peninsula's large Muslim and Jewish population would have a 'heretical' influence on the Catholic population. Rome pressed the kingdoms to accept the Papal Inquisition after Aragon. Navarra conceded in the 13th century and Portugal by the end of the 14th, though its 'Roman Inquisition' was famously inactive. Castile refused steadily, trusting in its prominent position in Europe and its military power to keep the Pope's interventionism in check. By the end of the Middle Ages, England, due to distance and voluntary compliance, and the Castile (future part of Spain), due to resistance and power, were the only Western European kingdoms to successfully resist the establishment of the Inquisition in their realms.

Medieval Inquisition in Aragon
Although Raymond of Penyafort was not an inquisitor,  James I of Aragon had often consulted him on questions of law regarding the practices of the Inquisition in the king's domains since Penyafort was a canon lawyer and royal advisor.

...[T]he lawyer's deep sense of justice and equity, combined with the worthy Dominican's sense of compassion, allowed him to steer clear of the excesses that were found elsewhere in the formative years of the inquisitions into heresy.

Despite its early implantation, the Papal Inquisition was greatly resisted within the Crown of Aragon by both population and monarchs. With time, its importance was diluted, and, by the middle of the fifteenth century, it was almost forgotten although still there according to the law.

Regarding the living conditions of minorities, the kings of Aragon and other monarchies imposed some discriminatory taxation of religious minorities, so false conversions were a way of tax evasion.

In addition to the above discriminatory legislation, Aragon had laws specifically targeted at protecting minorities. For example, crusaders attacking Jewish or Muslim subjects of the King of Aragon while on their way to fight in the reconquest were punished with death by hanging. Up to the 14th century, the census and wedding records show an absolute lack of concern with avoiding intermarriage or blood mixture. Such laws were now common in most of central Europe. Both the Roman Inquisition and neighbouring Christian powers showed discomfort with Aragonese law and lack of concern with ethnicity, but to little effect.

High-ranking officials of Jewish religion were not as common as in Castile, but were not unheard of either. Abraham Zacuto was a professor at the university of Cartagena. Vidal Astori was the royal silversmith for Ferdinand II of Aragon and conducted business in his name. And King Ferdinand himself was said to have remote Jewish ancestry on his mother's side.

Medieval Inquisition in Castile
There was never a tribunal of the Papal Inquisition in Castile, nor any inquisition during the Middle Ages. Members of the episcopate were charged with surveillance of the faithful and punishment of transgressors, always under the direction of the king.

During the Middle Ages in Castile, the Catholic ruling class and the population paid little or no attention to heresy. Castile did not have the proliferation of anti-Jewish pamphlets as England and France did during the 13th and 14th centuries—and those that have been found were modified, watered-down versions of the original stories. Jews and Muslims were tolerated and generally allowed to follow their traditional customs in domestic matters.

The legislation regarding Muslims and Jews in Castilian territory varied greatly, becoming more intolerant during the period of great instability and dynastic wars that occurred by the end of the 14th century. Castilian law is particularly difficult to summarize since, due to the model of the free Royal Villas, mayors and the population of border areas had the right to create their own fueros (law) that varied from one villa to the next. In general, the Castilian model was parallel to the initial model of Islamic Spain. Non-Catholics were subject to discriminatory legislation regarding taxation and some other specific discriminatory legislation—such as a prohibition on wearing silk or "flashy clothes"—that varied from county to county, but were otherwise left alone. Forced conversion of minorities was against the law, and so was the belief in the existence of witchcraft, oracles or similar superstitions. In general, all "people from the book" were permitted to practice their own customs and religions as far as they did not attempt proselytizing on the Christian population. Jews particularly had surprising freedoms and protections compared with other areas of Europe and were allowed to hold high public offices such as the counselor, treasurer or secretary for the crown.

During most of the medieval period, intermarriage with converts was allowed and encouraged. Intellectual cooperation between religions was the norm in Castile. Some examples are the Toledo School of Translators from the 11th century. Jews and Moors were allowed to hold high offices in the administration (see Abraham Seneor, Samuel HaLevi Abulafia, Isaac Abarbanel, López de Conchillos, Miguel Pérez de Almazán, Jaco Aben Nunnes and Fernando del Pulgar).

A tightening of the laws to protect the right of Jews to collect loans during the Medieval Crisis was one of the causes of the revolt against Peter the Cruel and catalyst of the anti-semitic episodes of 1391 in Castile, a kingdom that had shown no significant antisemitic backlash to the black death and drought crisis of the early 14th century. Even after the sudden increase in hostility towards other religions that the kingdom experienced after the 14th-century crisis, which clearly worsened the living conditions of non-Catholics in Castile, it remained one of the most tolerant kingdoms in Europe.

The kingdom had serious tensions with Rome regarding the Church's attempts to extend its authority into the kingdom. A focus of conflict was Castilian resistance to truly abandon the Mozarabic Rite, and the refusal to grant Papal control over Reconquest land (a request Aragon and Portugal conceded). These conflicts added to a strong resistance to allowing the creation of an Inquisition, and the kingdom's general willingness to accept heretics seeking refuge from prosecution in France.

Creation of the Spanish Inquisition
There are several hypotheses of what prompted the creation of the tribunal after centuries of tolerance (within the context of medieval Europe).

The "Too Multi-Religious" hypothesis
The Spanish Inquisition is interpretable as a response to the multi-religious nature of Spanish society following the reconquest of the Iberian Peninsula from the Muslim Moors. After invading in 711, the Moors controlled large areas of the Iberian Peninsula until 1250; afterwards they were restricted to Granada, which fell in 1492. The Reconquista did not result in the total expulsion of Muslims from Spain, since they, along with Jews, were tolerated by the ruling Christian elite. Large cities, especially Seville, Valladolid, and Barcelona, had significant Jewish populations centered on Juderia, but in the coming years the Muslims became increasingly alienated and relegated from power centers.

Post-reconquest medieval Spain has been characterized by Américo Castro as a society of relatively peaceful co-existence (convivencia) punctuated by occasional conflict among the ruling Catholics and the Jews and Muslims. As historian Henry Kamen notes, the "so-called convivencia was always a relationship between unequals." Despite their legal inequality, there was a long tradition of Jewish service to the Crown of Aragon, and Jews occupied many important posts, both religious and political. Castile itself had an unofficial rabbi. Ferdinand's father John II named the Jewish Abiathar Crescas Court Astronomer.

Anti-semitic attitudes increased all over Europe during the late 13th century and throughout the 14th century. England and France expelled their Jewish populations in 1290 and 1306 respectively. At the same time, during the Reconquista, Spain's anti-Jewish sentiment steadily increased. This prejudice climaxed in the summer of 1391 when violent anti-Jewish riots broke out in Spanish cities like Barcelona. To linguistically distinguish them from non-converted or long-established Catholic families, new converts were called conversos, or New Catholics. This event must be understood in the context of the fierce civil war and new politics that Peter the Cruel had brought to the land, and not be confused with spontaneous anti-semitic reactions to the plague seen in northern Europe.

According to Don Hasdai Crescas, persecution against Jews began in earnest in Seville in 1391, on the 1st day of the lunar month Tammuz (June). From there the violence spread to Córdoba, and by the 17th day of the same lunar month, it had reached Toledo (called then by Jews after its Arabic name "Ṭulayṭulah") in the region of Castile. Then the violence spread to Majorca and by the 1st day of the lunar month Elul it had also reached the Jews of Barcelona in Catalonia, where the slain were estimated at two-hundred and fifty. Indeed, many Jews who resided in the neighboring provinces of Lérida and Gironda and in the kingdom of València had also been affected, as were also the Jews of Al-Andalus (Andalucía). While many died a martyr's death, others converted to save themselves.

Encouraged by the preaching of Ferrand Martínez, Archdeacon of Ecija, the general unrest affected nearly all of the Jews in Spain, during which time an estimated 200,000 Jews changed their religion or else concealed their religion, becoming known in Hebrew as Anusim, meaning, "those who are compelled [to hide their religion]." Only a handful of the more principal persons of the Jewish community, those who had found refuge among the viceroys in the outlying towns and districts, managed to escape.

Forced baptism was contrary to the law of the Catholic Church, and theoretically anybody who had been forcibly baptized could legally return to Judaism. Legal definitions of the time theoretically acknowledged that a forced baptism was not a valid sacrament, but confined this to cases where it was literally administered by physical force: a person who had consented to baptism under threat of death or serious injury was still regarded as a voluntary convert, and accordingly forbidden to revert to Judaism. After the public violence, many of the converted "felt it safer to remain in their new religion." Thus, after 1391, a new social group appeared and were referred to as conversos or New Christians. Many conversos, now freed from the anti-Semitic restrictions imposed on Jewish employment, attained important positions in fifteenth-century Spain, including positions in the government and in the Church. Among many others, physicians Andrés Laguna and Francisco López de Villalobos (Ferdinand's court physician), writers Juan del Enzina, Juan de Mena, Diego de Valera and Alonso de Palencia, and bankers Luis de Santángel and Gabriel Sánchez (who financed the voyage of Christopher Columbus) were all conversos. Conversos—not without opposition—managed to attain high positions in the ecclesiastical hierarchy, at times becoming severe detractors of Judaism. Some even received titles of nobility and, as a result, during the following century some works attempted to demonstrate many nobles of Spain were descended from Israelites.

The "Enforcement Across Borders" hypothesis

According to this hypothesis, the Inquisition was created to standardize the variety of laws and many jurisdictions Spain was divided into. It would be an administrative program analogous to the Santa Hermandad (the "Holy Brotherhood", a law enforcement body, answering to the crown, that prosecuted thieves and criminals across counties in a way local county authorities could not, ancestor to the Guardia Civil), an institution that would guarantee uniform prosecution of crimes against royal laws across all local jurisdictions.

The Kingdom of Castile had been prosperous and successful in Europe thanks in part to the unusual authority and control the king exerted over the nobility, which ensured political stability and kept the kingdom from being weakened by in-fighting (as was the case in England, for example). Under the Trastámara dynasty, both kings of Castile and Aragon had lost power to the great nobles, who now formed dissenting and conspiratorial factions. Taxation and varying privileges differed from county to county, and powerful noble families constantly extorted the kings to attain further concessions, particularly in Aragon.

The main goals of the reign of the Catholic Monarchs were to unite their two kingdoms and strengthen royal influence to guarantee stability. In pursuit of this, they sought to further unify the laws of their realms and reduce the power of the nobility in certain local areas. They attained this partially by raw military strength by creating a combined army between the two of them that could outmatch the army of most noble coalitions in the Peninsula. It was impossible to change the entire laws of both realms by force alone, and due to reasonable suspicion of one another the monarchs kept their kingdoms separate during their lifetimes. The only way to unify both kingdoms and ensure that Isabella, Ferdinand, and their descendants maintained the power of both kingdoms without uniting them in life was to find, or create, an executive, legislative and judicial arm directly under the Crown empowered to act in both kingdoms. This goal, the hypothesis goes, might have given birth to the Spanish Inquisition.

The religious organization to oversee this role was obvious: Catholicism was the only institution common to both kingdoms, and the only one with enough popular support that the nobility could not easily attack it. Through the Spanish Inquisition, Isabella and Ferdinand created a personal police force and personal code of law that rested above the structure of their respective realms without altering or mixing them, and could operate freely in both. As the Inquisition had the backing of both kingdoms, it would exist independent of both the nobility and local interests of either kingdom.

According to this view, the prosecution of heretics would be secondary, or simply not considered different, from the prosecution of conspirators, traitors, or groups of any kind who planned to resist royal authority. At the time, royal authority rested on divine right and on oaths of loyalty held before God, so the connection between religious deviation and political disloyalty would appear obvious. This hypothesis is supported by the disproportionately high representation of the nobility and high clergy among those investigated by the Inquisition, as well as by the many administrative and civil crimes the Inquisition oversaw. The Inquisition prosecuted the counterfeiting of royal seals and currency, ensured the effective transmission of the orders of the kings, and verified the authenticity of official documents traveling through the kingdoms, especially from one kingdom to the other. See "Non-Religious Crimes".

The "Placate Europe" hypothesis
At a time when most of Europe had already expelled the Jews from the Christian kingdoms, the "dirty blood" of Spaniards was met with open suspicion and contempt by the rest of Europe. As the world became smaller and foreign relations became more relevant to stay in power, this foreign image of "being the seed of Jews and Moors" may have become a problem. In addition, the coup that allowed Isabella to take the throne from Joana of Avis and the Catholic Monarchs to marry had estranged Castile from Portugal, its historical ally, and created the need for new relationships. Similarly, Aragon's ambitions lay in control of the Mediterranean and the defense against France. As their policy of royal marriages proved, the Catholic Monarchs were deeply concerned about France's growing power and expected to create strong dynastic alliances across Europe. In this scenario, the Iberian reputation of being too tolerant was a problem.

Despite the prestige earned through the reconquest (reconquista), the foreign image of Spaniards coexisted with an almost universal image of heretics and "bad Christians", due to the long coexistence between the three religions they had accepted in their lands. Anti-Jewish stereotypes created to justify or prompt the expulsion and expropriation of the European Jews were also applied to Spaniards in most European courts, and the idea of them being "greedy, gold-thirsty, cruel and violent" due to the "Jewish and Moorish blood" was prevalent in Europe before America was discovered by Europeans. Chronicles by foreign travelers circulated through Europe, describing the tolerant ambiance reigning in the court of Isabella and Ferdinand, and how Moors and Jews were free to go about without anyone trying to convert them. Past and common clashes between the Pope and the kingdoms of the Iberian Peninsula regarding the Inquisition in Castile's case and regarding South Italy in Aragon's case, also reinforced their image of heretics in the international courts. These accusations and images could have direct political and military consequences at the time, especially considering that the union of two powerful kingdoms was a particularly delicate moment that could prompt the fear and violent reactions from neighbors, even more if combined with the expansion of the Ottoman Turks on the Mediterranean.

The creation of the Inquisition and the expulsion of both Jews and Moriscos may have been part of a strategy to whitewash the image of Spain and ease international fears regarding Spain's allegiance. In this scenario, the creation of the Inquisition could have been part of the Catholic Monarchs' strategy to " turn" away from African allies and "towards" Europe, a tool to turn both actual Spain and the Spanish image more European and improve relations with the Pope.

The "Ottoman Scare" hypothesis
No matter if any of the previous hypotheses were already operating in the minds of the monarchs, the alleged discovery of Morisco plots to support a possible Ottoman invasion were crucial factors in their decision to create the Inquisition.

At this time, the Ottoman Empire was in rapid expansion and making its power noticeable in the Mediterranean and North Africa. At the same time, the Aragonese Mediterranean Empire was crumbling under debt and war exhaustion. Ferdinand reasonably feared that he would not be capable of repelling an Ottoman attack to Spain's shores, especially if the Ottomans had internal help. The regions with the highest concentration of Moriscos were those close to the common naval crossings between Spain and Africa. If the weakness of the Aragonese Naval Empire was combined with the resentment of the higher nobility against the monarchs, the dynastic claims of Portugal on Castile and the two monarchs' exterior politic that turned away from Morocco and other African nations in favor of Europe, the fear of a second Muslim invasion, and thus a second Muslim occupation was hardly unfounded. This fear may have been the base reason for the expulsion of those citizens who had either a religious reason to support the invasion of the Ottomans (Moriscos) or no particular religious reason to not do it (Jews). The Inquisition might have been part of the preparations to enforce these measures and ensure their effectiveness by rooting out false converts that would still pose a threat of foreign espionage.

In favor of this view there is the obvious military sense it makes, and the many early attempts of peaceful conversion and persuasion that the Monarchs used at the beginning of their reign, and the sudden turn towards the creation of the Inquisition and the edicts of expulsion when those initial attempts failed. The conquest of Naples by the Gran Capitan is also proof of an interest in Mediterranean expansion and re-establishment of Spanish power in that sea that was bound to generate frictions with the Ottoman Empire and other African nations. So, the Inquisition would have been created as a permanent body to prevent the existence of citizens with religious sympathies with African nations now that rivalry with them had been deemed unavoidable.

Philosophical and religious reasons
The creation of the Spanish Inquisition was consistent with the most important political philosophers of the Florentine School, with whom the kings were known to have contact (Guicciardini, Pico della Mirandola, Machiavelli, Segni, Pitti, Nardi, Varchi, etc.) Both Guicciardini and Machiavelli defended the importance of centralization and unification to create a strong state capable of repelling foreign invasions, and also warned of the dangers of excessive social uniformity to the creativity and innovation of a nation. Machiavelli considered piety and morals desirable for the subjects but not so much for the ruler, who should use them as a way to unify its population. He also warned of the nefarious influence of a corrupt church in the creation of a selfish population and middle nobility, which had fragmented the peninsula and made it unable to resist either France or Aragon. German philosophers at the time were spreading the importance of a vassal sharing the religion of their lord.

The Inquisition may have just been the result of putting these ideas into practice. The use of religion as a unifying factor across a land that was allowed to stay diverse and maintain different laws in other respects, and the creation of the Inquisition to enforce laws across it, maintain said religious unity and control the local elites were consistent with most of those teachings.

Alternatively, the enforcement of Catholicism across the realm might indeed be the result of simple religious devotion by the monarchs. The recent scholarship on the expulsion of the Jews leans towards the belief of religious motivations being at the bottom of it. But considering the reports on Ferdinand's political persona, that is unlikely the only reason. Ferdinand was described, among others, by Machiavelli, as a man who didn't know the meaning of piety, but who made political use of it and would have achieved little if he had really known it. He was Machiavelli's main inspiration while writing The Prince.

The "Keeping the Pope in Check" hypothesis
The hierarchy of the Catholic Church had made many attempts during the Middle Ages to take over Christian Spain politically, such as claiming the Church's ownership over all land reconquered from non-Christians (a claim that was rejected by Castille but accepted by Aragon and Portugal). In the past, the papacy had tried and partially succeeded, in forcing the Mozarabic Rite out of Iberia. Its intervention had been pivotal for Aragon's loss of Rosellon. The meddling regarding Aragon's control over South Italy was even stronger historically. In their lifetime, the Catholic Monarchs had problems with Pope Paul II, a very strong proponent of absolute authority for the church over the kings. Carrillo actively opposed them both and often used Spain's "mixed blood" as an excuse to intervene. The papacy and the monarchs of Europe had been involved in a rivalry for power all through the high Middle Ages that Rome had already won in other powerful kingdoms like France.

Since the legitimacy granted by the church was necessary for both monarchs, especially Isabella, to stay in power, the creation of the Spanish Inquisition may have been a way to apparently concede to the Pope's demands and criticism regarding Spain's mixed religious heritage, while at the same time ensuring that the Pope could hardly force the second inquisition of his own, and at the same time create a tool to control the power of the Roman Church in Spain. The Spanish Inquisition was unique at the time because it was not led by the Pope. Once the bull of creation was granted, the head of the Inquisition was the Monarch of Spain. It was in charge of enforcing the laws of the king regarding religion and other private-life matters, not of following orders from Rome, from which it was independent. This independence allowed the Inquisition to investigate, prosecute and convict clergy for both corruptions and possible charges of treason of conspiracy against the crown (on the Pope's behalf presumably) without the Pope's intervention. The inquisition was, despite its title of "Holy", not necessarily formed by the clergy and secular lawyers were equally welcome to it. If it was an attempt at keeping Rome out of Spain, it was an extremely successful and refined one. It was a bureaucratic body that had the nominal authority of the church and permission to prosecute members of the church, which the kings could not do, while answering only to the Spanish Crown. This did not prevent the Pope from having some influence on the decisions of Spanish monarchs, but it did force the influence to be through the kings, making direct influence very difficult.

Other hypotheses
Other hypotheses that circulate regarding the Spanish Inquisition's creation include:
Economic reasons: Since one of the penalties that the Inquisition could enforce on the convicts was the confiscation of their property, which became Crown property, it has been stated that the creation of the Inquisition was a way to finance the crown. There is no solid reason for this hypothesis to stand alone, nor for the Kings of Spain to need an institution to do this gradually instead of confiscating property through edicts, but it may be one of the reasons why the Inquisition stayed for so long. This hypothesis notes the tendency of the Inquisition to operate in large and wealthy cities and is favoured by those who consider that most of those prosecuted for practising Judaism and Islam in secret were actually innocent of it. Gustav Bergenroth, editor and translator of the Spanish state papers from 1485–1509, believed that revenue was the incentive for Ferdinand and Isabella's decision to invite the Inquisition into Spain. Other authors point out that both monarchs were very aware of the economic consequences they would suffer from a decrease in population.
Intolerance and racism: This argument is usually made regarding the expulsion of the Jews or the Moriscos, and since the Inquisition was so closely interconnected with those actions can be expanded to it. It varies between those who deny that Spain was really that different from the rest of Europe regarding tolerance and openmindedness and those who argue that it used to be, but gradually the antisemitic and racist atmosphere of medieval Europe rubbed onto it. It explains the creation of the Inquisition as the result of exactly the same forces as those that caused the creation of similar entities across Europe. This view may account for the similarities between the Spanish Inquisition and similar institutions but completely fails to account for its many unique characteristics, including its time of appearance and its duration through time, so even if accepted requires the addition of some of the other hypothesis to be complete.
Purely religious reasons: essentially this view suggests that the Catholic Monarchs created the Inquisition to prosecute heretics and sodomites "because the Bible says so". A common criticism that this view receives is that the Bible also condemns greed, hypocrisy, and adultery, but the Inquisition was not in charge of prosecuting any of those things. It also did not prosecute those who did not go to mass on Sunday or otherwise broke the Catholic rituals as far as it was out of simple laziness. Considering this double standard, its role was probably more complex and specific.

Activity of the Inquisition

Start of the Inquisition

Fray Alonso de Ojeda, a Dominican friar from Seville, convinced Queen Isabella of the existence of Crypto-Judaism among Andalusian conversos during her stay in Seville between 1477 and 1478. A report, produced by Pedro González de Mendoza, Archbishop of Seville, and by the Segovian Dominican Tomás de Torquemada—of converso family himself—corroborated this assertion.

Spanish monarchs Ferdinand and Isabella requested a papal bull establishing an inquisition in Spain in 1478. Pope Sixtus IV granted a bull permitting the monarchs to select and appoint two or three priests over forty years of age to act as inquisitors. In 1483, Ferdinand and Isabella established a state council to administer the inquisition with the Dominican Friar Tomás de Torquemada acting as its president, even though Sixtus IV protested the activities of the inquisition in Aragon and its treatment of the conversos. Torquemada eventually assumed the title of Inquisitor-General.

Thomas F. Madden describes the world that formed medieval politics:
"The Inquisition was not born out of the desire to crush diversity or oppress people; it was rather an attempt to stop unjust executions. Yes, you read that correctly. Heresy was a crime against the state. Roman law in the Code of Justinian made it a capital offence. Rulers, whose authority was believed to come from God, had no patience for heretics".

Ferdinand II of Aragon pressured Pope Sixtus IV to agree to an Inquisition controlled by the monarchy by threatening to withdraw military support at a time when the Turks were a threat to Rome. The pope issued a bull to stop the Inquisition but was pressured into withdrawing it. On 1 November 1478, Sixtus published the Papal bull, Exigit Sinceras Devotionis Affectus, through which he gave the monarchs exclusive authority to name the inquisitors in their kingdoms. The first two inquisitors, Miguel de Morillo and Juan de San Martín, were not named until two years later, on 27 September 1480 in Medina del Campo.

The first auto-da-fé was held in Seville on 6 February 1481: six people were burned alive. From there, the Inquisition grew rapidly in the Kingdom of Castile. By 1492, tribunals existed in eight Castilian cities: Ávila, Córdoba, Jaén, Medina del Campo, Segovia, Sigüenza, Toledo, and Valladolid. Sixtus IV promulgated a new bull categorically prohibiting the Inquisition's extension to Aragón, affirming that:

According to the book A History of the Jewish People,

In 1483, Jews were expelled from all of Andalusia. Though the pope wanted to crack down on abuses, Ferdinand pressured him to promulgate a new bull, threatening that he would otherwise separate the Inquisition from Church authority. Sixtus did so on 17 October 1483, naming Tomás de Torquemada Inquisidor General of Aragón, Valencia, and Catalonia.

Torquemada quickly established procedures for the Inquisition. A new court would be announced with a thirty-day grace period for confessions and the gathering of accusations by neighbors. Evidence that was used to identify a crypto-Jew included the absence of chimney smoke on Saturdays (a sign the family might secretly be honoring the Sabbath) or the buying of many vegetables before Passover or the purchase of meat from a converted butcher. The court could employ physical torture to extract confessions once the guilt of the accused had been established. Crypto-Jews were allowed to confess and do penance, although those who relapsed were executed.

In 1484, Pope Innocent VIII attempted to allow appeals to Rome against the Inquisition, which would weaken the function of the institution as protection against the pope, but Ferdinand in December 1484 and again in 1509 decreed death and confiscation for anyone trying to make use of such procedures without royal permission.
With this, the Inquisition became the only institution that held authority across all the realms of the Spanish monarchy and, in all of them, a useful mechanism at the service of the crown. The cities of Aragón continued resisting, and even saw revolt, as in Teruel from 1484 to 1485. The murder of Inquisidor Pedro Arbués in Zaragoza on 15 September 1485, caused public opinion to turn against the conversos and in favour of the Inquisition. In Aragón, the Inquisitorial courts were focused specifically on members of the powerful converso minority, ending their influence in the Aragonese administration.

The Inquisition was extremely active between 1480 and 1530. Different sources give different estimates of the number of trials and executions in this period; some estimate about 2,000 executions, based on the documentation of the autos-da-fé, the great majority being conversos of Jewish origin. He offers striking statistics: 91.6% of those judged in Valencia between 1484 and 1530 and 99.3% of those judged in Barcelona between 1484 and 1505 were of Jewish origin.

False conversions

The Inquisition had jurisdiction only over Christians. It had no power to investigate, prosecute, or convict Jews, Muslims, or any open member of other religions. Anyone who was known to identify as either Jew or Muslim was outside of Inquisitorial jurisdiction and could be tried only by the King. All the inquisition could do in some of those cases was to deport the individual according to the King's law, but usually, even that had to go through a civil tribunal. The Inquisition had the authority to try only those who self-identified as Christians (initially for taxation purposes, later to avoid deportation as well) while practicing another religion de facto. Even those were treated as Christians. If they confessed or identified not as "judeizantes" but as fully practicing Jews, they fell back into the previously explained category and could not be targeted, although they would have pleaded guilty to previously lying about being Christian.

Expulsion of Jews and Jewish conversos

The Spanish Inquisition had been established in part to prevent conversos from engaging in Jewish practices, which, as Christians, they were supposed to have given up. This remedy for securing the orthodoxy of conversos was eventually deemed inadequate since the main justification the monarchy gave for formally expelling all Jews from Spain was the "great harm suffered by Christians (i.e., conversos) from the contact, intercourse and communication which they have with the Jews, who always attempt in various ways to seduce faithful Christians from our Holy Catholic Faith", according to the 1492 edict.

The Alhambra Decree, issued in January 1492, gave the choice between expulsion and conversion. It was among the few expulsion orders that allowed conversion as an alternative and is used as a proof of the religious, not racial, element of the measure. The enforcement of this decree was very unequal with the focus mainly on coastal and southern regions—those at risk of Ottoman invasion—and more gradual and ineffective enforcement towards the interior.

Historic accounts of the numbers of Jews who left Spain were based on speculation, and some aspects were exaggerated by early accounts and historians: Juan de Mariana speaks of 800,000 people, and Don Isaac Abravanel of 300,000. While few reliable statistics exist for the expulsion, modern estimates based on tax returns and population estimates of communities are much lower, with Kamen stating that of a population of approximately 80,000 Jews and 200,000 conversos, about 40,000 emigrated. The Jews of the kingdom of Castile emigrated mainly to Portugal (where the entire community was forcibly converted in 1497) and to North Africa. The Jews of the kingdom of Aragon fled to other Christian areas including Italy, rather than to Muslim lands as is often assumed. Although the vast majority of conversos simply assimilated into the Catholic dominant culture, a minority continued to practice Judaism in secret, gradually migrated throughout Europe, North Africa, and the Ottoman Empire, mainly to areas where Sephardic communities were already present as a result of the Alhambra Decree.

The most intense period of persecution of conversos lasted until 1530. From 1531 to 1560 the percentage of conversos among the Inquisition trials dropped to 3% of the total. There was a rebound of persecutions when a group of crypto-Jews was discovered in Quintanar de la Orden in 1588 and there was a rise in denunciations of conversos in the last decade of the sixteenth century. At the beginning of the seventeenth century, some conversos who had fled to Portugal began to return to Spain, fleeing the persecution of the Portuguese Inquisition, founded in 1536. This led to a rapid increase in the trials of crypto-Jews, among them a number of important financiers. In 1691, during a number of autos-da-fé in Majorca, 37 chuetas, or conversos of Majorca, were burned.

During the eighteenth century, the number of conversos accused by the Inquisition decreased significantly. Manuel Santiago Vivar, tried in Córdoba in 1818, was the last person tried for being a crypto-Jew.

Expulsion of Moriscos and Morisco conversos

The Inquisition searched for false or relapsed converts among the Moriscos, who had converted from Islam. Beginning with a decree on 14 February 1502, Muslims in Granada had to choose between conversion to Christianity or expulsion. In the Crown of Aragon, most Muslims faced this choice after the Revolt of the Brotherhoods (1519–1523). It is important to note that the enforcement of the expulsion of the moriscos was done really unevenly, especially in the lands of the interior and the north, where the coexistence had lasted for over five centuries and moriscos were protected by the population, and orders were partially or completely ignored.

The War of the Alpujarras (1568–71), a general Muslim/Morisco uprising in Granada that expected to aid Ottoman disembarkation in the peninsula, ended in a forced dispersal of about half of the region's Moriscos throughout Castile and Andalusia as well as increased suspicions by Spanish authorities against this community.

Many Moriscos were suspected of practising Islam in secret, and the jealousy with which they guarded the privacy of their domestic life prevented the verification of this suspicion. Initially, they were not severely persecuted by the Inquisition, experiencing instead a policy of evangelization a policy not followed with those conversos who were suspected of being crypto-Jews. There were various reasons for this. In the kingdoms of Valencia and Aragon, a large number of the Moriscos were under the jurisdiction of the nobility, and persecution would have been viewed as a frontal assault on the economic interests of this powerful social class. Most importantly, the moriscos had integrated into the Spanish society significantly better than the Jews, intermarrying with the population often, and were not seen as a foreign element, especially in rural areas. Still, fears ran high among the population that the Moriscos were traitorous, especially in Granada. The coast was regularly raided by Barbary pirates backed by Spain's enemy, the Ottoman Empire, and the Moriscos were suspected of aiding them.

In the second half of the century, late in the reign of Philip II, conditions worsened between Old Christians and Moriscos. The Morisco Revolt in Granada in 1568–1570 was harshly suppressed, and the Inquisition intensified its attention on the Moriscos. From 1570 Morisco cases became predominant in the tribunals of Zaragoza, Valencia and Granada; in the tribunal of Granada, between 1560 and 1571, 82% of those accused were Moriscos, who were a vast majority of the Kingdom's population at the time. Still, the Moriscos did not experience the same harshness as judaizing conversos and Protestants, and the number of capital punishments was proportionally less.

In 1609, King Philip III, upon the advice of his financial adviser the Duke of Lerma and Archbishop of Valencia Juan de Ribera, decreed the Expulsion of the Moriscos. Hundreds of thousands of Moriscos were expelled. This was further fueled by the religious intolerance of Archbishop Ribera who quoted the Old Testament texts ordering the enemies of God to be slain without mercy and setting forth the duties of kings to extirpate them. The edict required: 'The Moriscos to depart, under the pain of death and confiscation, without trial or sentence... to take with them no money, bullion, jewels or bills of exchange.... just what they could carry.' Although initial estimates of the number expelled such as those of Henri Lapeyre reach 300,000 Moriscos (or 4% of the total Spanish population), the extent and severity of the expulsion in much of Spain has been increasingly challenged by modern historians such as Trevor J. Dadson. Nevertheless, the eastern region of Valencia, where ethnic tensions were high, was particularly affected by the expulsion, suffering economic collapse and depopulation of much of its territory.

Of those permanently expelled, the majority finally settled in the Maghreb or the Barbary coast. Those who avoided expulsion or who managed to return were gradually absorbed by the dominant culture.

The Inquisition pursued some trials against Moriscos who remained or returned after expulsion: at the height of the Inquisition, cases against Moriscos are estimated to have constituted less than 10 percent of those judged by the Inquisition. Upon the coronation of Philip IV in 1621, the new king gave the order to desist from attempting to impose measures on remaining Moriscos and returnees. In September 1628 the Council of the Supreme Inquisition ordered inquisitors in Seville not to prosecute expelled Moriscos "unless they cause significant commotion." The last mass prosecution against Moriscos for crypto-Islamic practices occurred in Granada in 1727, with most of those convicted receiving relatively light sentences. By the end of the 18th century, the indigenous practice of Islam is considered to have been effectively extinguished in Spain.

Christian heretics

The Spanish Inquisition had jurisdiction only over Christians. Therefore, only those who self-identified as Christians could be investigated and trialed by it. Those in the group of "heretics" were all subject to investigation. All forms of heretic Christianity (Protestants, Orthodox, blaspheming Catholics, etc.) were considered under its jurisdiction.

Protestantism 

Despite popular myths about the Spanish Inquisition relating to Protestants, it dealt with very few cases involving actual Protestants, as there were so few in Spain. The Inquisition of the Netherlands is here not considered part of the Spanish Inquisition. Lutheran was a portmanteau accusation used by the Inquisition to act against all those who acted in a way that was offensive to the church. The first of the trials against those labeled by the Inquisition as "Lutheran" were those against the sect of mystics known as the "Alumbrados" of Guadalajara and Valladolid. The trials were long and ended with prison sentences of differing lengths, though none of the sect were executed. Nevertheless, the subject of the "Alumbrados" put the Inquisition on the trail of many intellectuals and clerics who, interested in Erasmian ideas, had strayed from orthodoxy. This is striking because both Charles I and Philip II were confessed admirers of Erasmus. The humanist Juan de Valdés fled to Italy to escape anti-Erasmian factions that came to power in the court, and the preacher Juan de Ávila spent close to a year in prison after he was questioned about his prayer practices.

The first trials against Lutheran groups, as such, took place between 1558 and 1562, at the beginning of the reign of Philip II, against two communities of Protestants from the cities of Valladolid and Seville, numbering about 120. The trials signaled a notable intensification of the Inquisition's activities. A number of autos-da-fé were held, some of them presided over by members of the royal family, and around 100 executions took place. The autos-da-fé of the mid-century virtually put an end to Spanish Protestantism, which was, throughout, a small phenomenon to begin with.

After 1562, though the trials continued, the repression was much reduced. About 200 Spaniards were accused of being Protestants in the last decades of the 16th century.

Most of them were in no sense Protestants ... Irreligious sentiments, drunken mockery, anticlerical expressions, were all captiously classified by the inquisitors (or by those who denounced the cases) as "Lutheran." Disrespect to church images, and eating meat on forbidden days, were taken as signs of heresy... 

It is estimated that a dozen Spaniards were burned alive.

Protestantism was treated as a marker to identify agents of foreign powers and symptoms of political disloyalty as much as, if not more than a cause of prosecution in itself. Religion, patriotism, obedience to the king and personal beliefs were not seen as separate aspects of life until the end of the Modern Age. Spain especially had a long tradition of using self-identified religion as a political and cultural marker, and expression of loyalty to a specific overlord, more than as an accurate description of personal beliefs -here the common accusation of heretics they received from Rome. In that note, accusations or prosecutions due to beliefs held by enemy countries must be seen as political accusations regarding political treason more than as religious ones. Other times the accusation of Protestantism was considered as an equivalent of blasphemy, just a general way of addressing insubordination.

Orthodox Christianity

Even though the Inquisition had theoretical permission to investigate Orthodox "heretics", it almost never did. There was no major war between Spain and any Orthodox nation, so there was no reason to do so. There was one casualty tortured by those "Jesuits" (though most likely, Franciscans) who administered the Spanish Inquisition in North America, according to authorities within the Eastern Orthodox Church: St. Peter the Aleut. Even that single report has various numbers of inaccuracies that make it problematic, and has no confirmation in the Inquisitorial archives.

Witchcraft and superstition

The category "superstitions" includes trials related to witchcraft. The witch-hunt in Spain had much less intensity than in other European countries (particularly France, Scotland, and Germany). One remarkable case was that of Logroño, in which the witches of Zugarramurdi in Navarre were persecuted. During the auto-da-fé that took place in Logroño on 7 and 8 November 1610, six people were burned and another five burned in effigy. The role of the Inquisition in cases of witchcraft was much more restricted than is commonly believed. Well after the foundation of the Inquisition, jurisdiction over sorcery and witchcraft remained in secular hands. In general the Inquisition maintained a skeptical attitude towards cases of witchcraft, considering it as a mere superstition without any basis. Alonso de Salazar Frías, who took the Edict of Faith to various parts of Navarre after the trials of Logroño, noted in his report to the Suprema that, "There were neither witches nor bewitched in a village until they were talked and written about".

Blasphemy
Included under the rubric of heretical propositions were verbal offences, from outright blasphemy to questionable statements regarding religious beliefs, from issues of sexual morality to misbehaviour of the clergy. Many were brought to trial for affirming that simple fornication (sex between unmarried persons) was not a sin or for putting in doubt different aspects of Christian faith such as Transubstantiation or the virginity of Mary. Also, members of the clergy themselves were occasionally accused of heretical propositions. These offences rarely led to severe penalties.

Sodomy
The first sodomite was burned by the Inquisition in Valencia in 1572, and those accused included 19% clergy, 6% nobles, 37% workers, 19% servants, and 18% soldiers and sailors.

Nearly all of almost 500 cases of sodomy between persons concerned the relationship between an older man and an adolescent, often by coercion, with only a few cases where the couple were consenting homosexual adults. About 100 of the total involved allegations of child abuse. Adolescents were generally punished more leniently than adults, but only when they were very young (under c. 12 years) or when the case clearly concerned rape did they have a chance to avoid punishment altogether. As a rule, the Inquisition condemned to death only those sodomites over the age of 25 years. As about half of those tried were under this age, it explains the relatively small percentage of death sentences.

Cases of sodomy did not receive the same treatment in all areas of Spain. In the Kingdom of Castile, crimes of sodomy were not investigated by the Inquisition unless they were associated with religious heresy. In other words, the sodomy itself was investigated only as, and when, considered a symptom of a heretic belief or practice. In any other area, cases were considered an issue for civil authorities, and even then were not very actively investigated. The Crown of Aragon was the only area in which cases of sodomy were considered under the Inquisitorial jurisdiction, probably due to the previous presence of the Pontifical Inquisition in that kingdom. Within the Crown of Aragon, the tribunal of the city of Zaragoza was famously harsh even at the time.

Freemasonry

The Roman Catholic Church has regarded Freemasonry as heretical since about 1738; the suspicion of Freemasonry was potentially a capital offence. Spanish Inquisition records reveal two prosecutions in Spain and only a few more throughout the Spanish Empire. In 1815, Francisco Javier de Mier y Campillo, the Inquisitor General of the Spanish Inquisition and the Bishop of Almería, suppressed Freemasonry and denounced the lodges as "societies which lead to atheism, to sedition and to all errors and crimes." He then instituted a purge during which Spaniards could be arrested on the charge of being "suspected of Freemasonry".

Censorship 

As one manifestation of the Counter-Reformation, the Spanish Inquisition worked actively to impede the diffusion of heretical ideas in Spain by producing "Indexes" of prohibited books. Such lists of prohibited books were common in Europe a decade before the Inquisition published its first. The first Index published in Spain in 1551 was, in reality, a reprinting of the Index published by the University of Leuven in 1550, with an appendix dedicated to Spanish texts. Subsequent Indexes were published in 1559, 1583, 1612, 1632, and 1640.

Included in the Indices, at one point, were some of the great works of Spanish literature, but most of the works were religious in nature and plays. A number of religious writers who are today considered saints by the Catholic Church saw their works appear in the Indexes. At first, this might seem counter-intuitive or even nonsensical—how were these Spanish authors published in the first place if their texts were then prohibited by the Inquisition and placed in the Index? The answer lies in the process of publication and censorship in Early Modern Spain. Books in Early Modern Spain faced prepublication licensing and approval (which could include modification) by both secular and religious authorities. Once approved and published, the circulating text also faced the possibility of post-hoc censorship by being denounced to the Inquisition—sometimes decades later. Likewise, as Catholic theology evolved, once-prohibited texts might be removed from the Index.

At first, inclusion in the Index meant total prohibition of a text. This proved not only impractical and unworkable but also contrary to the goals of having a literate and well-educated clergy. Works with one line of suspect dogma would be prohibited in their entirety, despite the orthodoxy of the remainder of the text. In time, a compromise solution was adopted in which trusted Inquisition officials blotted out words, lines or whole passages of otherwise acceptable texts, thus allowing these expurgated editions to circulate. Although in theory, the Indexes imposed enormous restrictions on the diffusion of culture in Spain, some historians argue that such strict control was impossible in practice and that there was much more liberty in this respect than is often believed. And Irving Leonard has conclusively demonstrated that, despite repeated royal prohibitions, romances of chivalry, such as Amadis of Gaul, found their way to the New World with the blessing of the Inquisition. Moreover, with the coming of the Age of Enlightenment in the 18th century, increasing numbers of licenses to possess and read prohibited texts were granted.

Despite the repeated publication of the Indexes and a large bureaucracy of censors, the activities of the Inquisition did not impede the development of Spanish literature's "Siglo de Oro", although almost all of its major authors crossed paths with the Holy Office at one point or another. Among the Spanish authors included in the Index are Bartolomé Torres Naharro, Juan del Enzina, Jorge de Montemayor, Juan de Valdés and Lope de Vega, as well as the anonymous Lazarillo de Tormes and the Cancionero General by Hernando del Castillo. La Celestina, which was not included in the Indexes of the 16th century, was expurgated in 1632 and prohibited in its entirety in 1790. Among the non-Spanish authors prohibited were Ovid, Dante, Rabelais, Ariosto, Machiavelli, Erasmus, Jean Bodin, Valentine Naibod and Thomas More (known in Spain as Tomás Moro). One of the most outstanding and best-known cases in which the Inquisition directly confronted literary activity is that of Fray Luis de León, noted humanist and religious writer of converso origin, who was imprisoned for four years (from 1572 to 1576) for having translated the Song of Songs directly from Hebrew.

Some scholars state that one of the main effects of the inquisition was to end free thought and scientific thought in Spain. As one contemporary Spaniard in exile put it: "Our country is a land of pride and envy ... barbarism; down there one cannot produce any culture without being suspected of heresy, error and Judaism. Thus silence was imposed on the learned." For the next few centuries, while the rest of Europe was slowly awakened by the influence of the Enlightenment, Spain stagnated. This conclusion is contested.

The censorship of books was actually very ineffective, and prohibited books circulated in Spain without significant problems. The Spanish Inquisition never persecuted scientists, and relatively few scientific books were placed on the Index. On the other hand, Spain was a state with more political freedom than in other absolute monarchies in the 16th to 18th centuries. The apparent paradox gets explained by both the hermeticist religious ideas of the Spanish church and monarchy, and the budding seed of what would become Enlightened absolutism taking shape in Spain. The list of banned books was not, as interpreted sometimes, a list of evil books but a list of books that lay people were very likely to misinterpret. The presence of highly symbolical and high-quality literature on the list was so explained. These metaphorical or parable sounding books were listed as not meant for free circulation, but there might be no objections to the book itself and the circulation among scholars was mostly free. Most of these books were carefully collected by the elite. The practical totality of the prohibited books can be found now as then in the library of the monasterio del Escorial, carefully collected by Philip II and Philip III. The collection was "public" after Philip II's death and members of universities, intellectuals, courtesans, clergy, and certain branches of the nobility didn't have too many problems to access them and commission authorised copies. The Inquisition has not been known to make any serious attempt to stop this for all the books, but there are some records of them "suggesting" the King of Spain to stop collecting grimoires or magic-related ones. This attitude was also not new. Translations of the Bible to Castillian and Provenzal (Catalan) had been made and allowed in Spain since the Middle Ages. The first preserved copy dates from the 13th century. Like the bible of Cisneros they were mostly for scholarly use, and it was customary for laymen to ask religious or academic authorities to review the translation and supervise the use.

Family and marriage

Bigamy
The Inquisition also pursued offenses against morals and general social order, at times in open conflict with the jurisdictions of civil tribunals. In particular, there were trials for bigamy, a relatively frequent offence in a society that only permitted divorce under the most extreme circumstances. In the case of men, the penalty was two hundred lashes and five to ten years of "service to the Crown". Said service could be whatever the court deemed most beneficial for the nation but it usually was either five years as an oarsman in a royal galley for those without any qualification (possibly a death sentence), or ten years working maintained but without salary in a public Hospital or charitable institution of the sort for those with some special skill, such as doctors, surgeons, or lawyers. The penalty was five to seven years as an oarsman in the case of Portugal.

Unnatural marriage
Under the category of "unnatural marriage" fell any marriage or attempted marriage between two individuals who could not procreate. The Catholic Church in general, and in particular a nation constantly at war like Spain, emphasised the reproductive goal of marriage.

The Spanish Inquisition's policy in this regard was restrictive but applied in a very egalitarian way. It considered unnatural any non-reproductive marriage, and natural any reproductive one, regardless of gender or sex involved. The two forms of obvious male sterility were either due to damage to the genitals through castration, or accidental wounding at war (capón), or to some genetic condition that might keep the man from completing puberty (lampiño). Female sterility was also a reason to declare a marriage unnatural but was harder to prove. One case that dealt with marriage, sex, and gender was the trial of Eleno de Céspedes.

Non-religious crimes
Despite popular belief, the role of the Inquisition as a mainly religious institution, or religious in nature at all, is contested at best. Its main function was that of private police for the Crown with jurisdiction to enforce the law in those crimes that took place in the private sphere of life. The notion of religion and civil law being separate is a modern construction and made no sense in the 15th century, so there was no difference between breaking a law regarding religion and breaking a law regarding tax collection. The difference between them is a modern projection the institution itself did not have.
As such, the Inquisition was the prosecutor (in some cases the only prosecutor) of any crimes that could be perpetrated without the public taking notice (mainly domestic crimes, crimes against the weakest members of society, administrative crimes and forgeries, organized crime, and crimes against the Crown).

Examples include crimes associated with sexual or family relations such as rape and sexual violence (the Inquisition was the first and only body who punished it across the nation), bestiality, pedophilia (often overlapping with sodomy), incest, child abuse or neglect and (as discussed) bigamy. Non-religious crimes also included procurement (not prostitution), human trafficking, smuggling, forgery or falsification of currency, documents or signatures, tax fraud (many religious crimes were considered subdivisions of this one), illegal weapons, swindles, disrespect to the Crown or its institutions (the Inquisition included, but also the church, the guard, and the kings themselves), espionage for a foreign power, conspiracy, treason.

The non-religious crimes processed by the Inquisition accounted for a considerable percentage of its total investigations and are often hard to separate in the statistics, even when documentation is available. The line between religious and non-religious crimes did not exist in 15th century Spain as legal concept. Many of the crimes listed here and some of the religious crimes listed in previous sections were contemplated under the same article. For example, "sodomy" included paedophilia as a subtype. Often part of the data given for prosecution of male homosexuality corresponds to convictions for paedophilia, not adult homosexuality. In other cases, religious and non-religious crimes were seen as distinct but equivalent. The treatment of public blasphemy and street swindlers was similar (since in both cases you are "misleading the public in a harmful way"). Making counterfeit currency and heretic proselytism were also treated similarly; both of them were punished by death and subdivided in similar ways since both were "spreading falsifications". In general heresy and falsifications of material documents were treated similarly by the Spanish Inquisition, indicating that they may have been thought of as equivalent actions.

Another difficulty to discriminate the inquisition's secular and religious activity is the common association of certain types of investigations. An accusation or suspicion on certain crime often launched an automatic investigation on many others. Anyone accused of espionage due to non-religious reasons would likely be investigated for heresy too, and anyone suspected of a heresy associated to a foreign power would be investigated for espionage too automatically. Likewise, some religious crimes were considered likely to be associated with non-religious crimes, like human trafficking, procurement, and child abuse was expected to be associated to sodomy, or sodomy was expected to be associated to heresy and false conversions. Which accusation started the investigation isn't always clear.

Finally, trials were often further complicated by the attempts of witnesses or victims to add further charges, especially witchcraft. Like in the case of Eleno de Céspedes, charges for witchcraft done in this way, or in general, were quickly dismissed but they often show in the statistics as investigations made.

Organization 
Beyond its role in religious affairs, the Inquisition was also an institution at the service of the monarchy. The Inquisitor General, in charge of the Holy Office, was designated by the crown. The Inquisitor General was the only public office whose authority stretched to all the kingdoms of Spain (including the American viceroyalties), except for a brief period (1507–1518) during which there were two Inquisitors General, one in the kingdom of Castile, and the other in Aragon.

The Inquisitor General presided over the Council of the Supreme and General Inquisition (generally abbreviated as "Council of the Suprema"), created in 1483, which was made up of six members named directly by the crown (the number of members of the Suprema varied over the course of the Inquisition's history, but it was never more than 10). Over time, the authority of the Suprema grew at the expense of the power of the Inquisitor General.

The Suprema met every morning, except for holidays, and for two hours in the afternoon on Tuesdays, Thursdays, and Saturdays. The morning sessions were devoted to questions of faith, while the afternoons were reserved for "minor heresies" cases of perceived unacceptable sexual behavior, bigamy, witchcraft, etc.

Below the Suprema were the various tribunals of the Inquisition, which were originally itinerant, installing themselves where they were necessary to combat heresy, but later being established in fixed locations. During the first phase, numerous tribunals were established, but the period after 1495 saw a marked tendency towards centralization.

In the kingdom of Castile, the following permanent tribunals of the Inquisition were established:
 1482 In Seville and in Córdoba.
 1485 In Toledo and in Llerena.
 1488 In Valladolid and in Murcia.
 1489 In Cuenca.
 1505 In Las Palmas (Canary Islands).
 1512 In Logroño.
 1526 In Granada.
 1574 In Santiago de Compostela.

There were only four tribunals in the kingdom of Aragon: Zaragoza and Valencia (1482), Barcelona (1484), and Majorca (1488). Ferdinand the Catholic also established the Spanish Inquisition in Sicily (1513), housed in Palermo, and Sardinia, in the town of Sassari. In the Americas, tribunals were established in Lima and in Mexico City (1569) and, in 1610, in Cartagena de Indias (present day Colombia).

Composition of the tribunals

Initially, each of the tribunals included two inquisitors, calificadors (qualifiers), an alguacil (bailiff), and a fiscal (prosecutor); new positions were added as the institution matured. The inquisitors were preferably jurists more than theologians; in 1608 Philip III even stipulated that all inquisitors needed to have a background in law. The inquisitors did not typically remain in the position for a long time: for the Court of Valencia, for example, the average tenure in the position was about two years. Most of the inquisitors belonged to the secular clergy (priests who were not members of religious orders) and had a university education.

The fiscal was in charge of presenting the accusation, investigating the denunciations and interrogating the witnesses by the use of physical and mental torture. The calificadores were generally theologians; it fell to them to determine whether the defendant's conduct added up to a crime against the faith. Consultants were expert jurists who advised the court in questions of procedure. The court had, in addition, three secretaries: the notario de secuestros (Notary of Property), who registered the goods of the accused at the moment of his detention; the notario del secreto (Notary of the Secret), who recorded the testimony of the defendant and the witnesses; and the escribano general (General Notary), secretary of the court. The alguacil was the executive arm of the court, responsible for detaining, jailing, and physically torturing the defendant. Other civil employees were the nuncio, ordered to spread official notices of the court, and the alcaide, the jailer in charge of feeding the prisoners.

In addition to the members of the court, two auxiliary figures existed that collaborated with the Holy Office: the familiares and the comissarios (commissioners). Familiares were lay collaborators of the Inquisition, who had to be permanently at the service of the Holy Office. To become a familiar was considered an honor, since it was a public recognition of limpieza de sangre—Old Christian status—and brought with it certain additional privileges. Although many nobles held the position, most of the familiares came from the ranks of commoners. The commissioners, on the other hand, were members of the religious orders who collaborated occasionally with the Holy Office.

One of the most striking aspects of the organization of the Inquisition was its form of financing: devoid of its own budget, the Inquisition depended exclusively on the confiscation of the goods of the denounced. It is not surprising, therefore, that many of those prosecuted were rich men. That the situation was open to abuse is evident, as stands out in the memorandum that a converso from Toledo directed to Charles I:

Your Majesty must provide, before all else, that the expenses of the Holy Office do not come from the properties of the condemned, because if that is the case if they do not burn they do not eat.

Accusation 
When the Inquisition arrived in a city, the first step was the Edict of Grace. Following the Sunday Mass, the Inquisitor would proceed to read the edict; it explained possible heresies and encouraged all the congregation to come to the tribunals of the Inquisition to "relieve their consciences". They were called Edicts of Grace because all of the self-incriminated who presented themselves within a period of grace (usually ranging from thirty to forty days) were offered the possibility of reconciliation with the Church without severe punishment. The promise of benevolence was effective, and many voluntarily presented themselves to the Inquisition and were often encouraged to denounce others who had also committed offences, informants being the Inquisition's primary source of information. After about 1500, the Edicts of Grace were replaced by the Edicts of Faith, which left out the grace period and instead encouraged the denunciation of those guilty.

The denunciations were anonymous, and the defendants had no way of knowing the identities of their accusers. This was one of the points most criticized by those who opposed the Inquisition (for example, the Cortes of Castile, in 1518). In practice, false denunciations were frequent. Denunciations were made for a variety of reasons, from genuine concern to rivalries and personal jealousies.

Detention 

After a denunciation, the case was examined by the calificadores, who had to determine whether there was heresy involved, followed by the detention of the accused. In practice many were detained in preventive custody, and many cases of lengthy incarcerations occurred, lasting up to two years before the calificadores examined the case.

Detention of the accused entailed the preventive sequestration of their property by the Inquisition. The property of the prisoner was used to pay for procedural expenses and the accused's own maintenance and costs. Often the relatives of the defendant found themselves in outright misery. This situation was remedied only following instructions written in 1561.

Some authors, such as Thomas William Walsh, stated that the entire process was undertaken with the utmost secrecy, as much for the public as for the accused, who were not informed about the accusations that were levied against them. Months or even years could pass without the accused being informed about why they were imprisoned. The prisoners remained isolated, and, during this time, the prisoners were not allowed to attend Mass nor receive the sacraments. The jails of the Inquisition were no worse than those of secular authorities, and there are even certain testimonies that occasionally they were much better. There are few records of the time of the accused in prison, but the transcription of the trials repeatedly shows the accused being informed of every charge during the trial. They also show the accused's answers, in which they address each accusation specifically. Given that they would be informed anyway, it makes little sense that the accused would be kept in the dark prior to the trial, unless the investigation was still open.

Trial 

The inquisitorial process consisted of a series of hearings, in which both the denouncers and the defendant gave testimony. A defense counsel was assigned to the defendant, a member of the tribunal itself, whose role was simply to advise the defendant and to encourage them to speak the truth. The prosecution was directed by the fiscal. Interrogation of the defendant was done in the presence of the Notary of the Secreto, who meticulously wrote down the words of the accused. The archives of the Inquisition, in comparison to those of other judicial systems of the era, are striking in the completeness of their documentation.

To defend themselves, the accused had two choices: abonos (to find favourable witnesses, akin to "substantive" evidence/testimony in Anglo-American law) or tachas (to demonstrate that the witnesses of accusers were not trustworthy, akin to Anglo-American "impeachment" evidence/testimony).

The documentation from the notary usually show the following content, which gives us an idea of what the actual trial was likely to look like:

A first page in which the notary wrote the date, the names and charges of the members of the tribunal, the name of the accused and the accuser, the accusation, and the names of everyone present in the room during the trial.
A second page with the accused's first statement about their innocence or culpability, and their general response and recollection of the facts. This part usually takes from a thick fluid paragraph to a couple of pages and are relatively formal, within the accused's education level, from which one can suspect that the accused had time to prepare it prior to either the trial or the declaration, and probably help from the defendant. This paragraph also shows the accused addressing every charge from the first page, by points, which shows that the accused must have been informed of the charges against them.
A third section with the fiscals name and the transcription of a speech in which they address the accused's statement, also by points, and presents their case regarding each one separately.
A fourth section, usually dated on the next day or a couple of days after the fiscal's intervention, with the name of the "procurador"( defendant) and the transcription of a speech in which they address the fiscal's arguments, again by points and separately, and defend the accused regarding each one.
A fifth section with the tribunal's response to this. In the vast majority of cases, the response is to order the search and calling of certain individuals, as witnesses, or of some experts such as doctors to testify and ratify some parts of what has been said, and giving a date for the tribunal to come together again and examine the evidence. Usually, the fiscal and procurator can ask for the presence of some witnesses here too, as it is inferred by them showing up later, but that is not always specifically stated in the transcripts and may be done outside of trial.
The next section is often dated sometime later. Each witness or expert is introduced by complete name, job, relationship to the victim if any, and relationship to the case. The witness's testimony is not transcribed word by word like in previous cases but summarized by the notary, probably because it was not prepared and does not follow a coherent, consistent order and writing implements were rather expensive to waste.
 A page in which the procurador(defendant) declared the questions he is going to make to (usually another) group of witnesses of his choice since he often states that "he has asked them to come"or "he has called them". The answers given by each witness follow, with each witness presented as in the previous section. These testimonies are also paraphrased and summarized but addressed by points, with the answer to each question paraphrased separately.
The fiscal and the procurador require equal copies of the testimony of the witnesses and keep them, demanding that no copy is shown to anyone until the end of a period of usually six days in which the witnesses have the chance to call the tribunal again to change their mind or add something.
A third meeting of the tribunal with a new date. The transcription of a new speech by the procurator stating his view of the declarations and wrapping the witnesses' testimony up from his perspective.
A similar intervention, usually far shorter, from the fiscal.
The response from the tribunal, paraphrased, which could be to dictate the sentence, but often was to require either further clarification from the witness (restarting the procedure from the second step) or call for another type of proof (restarting the procedure from the sixth step). These steps would repeat cyclically in the documentation of the trial, through different meetings of the tribunal and different weeks, until the tribunal has reached a conclusion.
A literal transcription of the verdict and sentence. If the accused has been accused of more than one thing the sentence usually comes by points too. It is not uncommon for some of the accusations to be dismissed along with the process and said the process to continue taking into account the remaining ones. While sentences of innocence could be given at any point in a trial for multiple crimes, sentences of culpability only appear once the trial is over and all investigations opened against the accused are closed.

Regarding the fairness of the trials, the structure of them was similar to modern trials and extremely advanced for the time. The Inquisition was dependent on the political power of the King. The lack of separation of powers allows assuming questionable fairness for certain scenarios. The fairness of the Inquisitorial tribunals seemed to be among the best in early modern Europe when it came to the trial of laymen."LA INQUISICIÓN ESPAÑOLA".José Martínez MillánAlianza Editorial Bolsillo(2010) There are also testimonies by former prisoners that, if believed, suggest that said fairness was less than ideal when national or political interests were involved.

To obtain a confession or information relevant to an investigation, the Inquisition used torture, but not in a systematic way. It could only be applied when all other options, witnesses and experts had been used, the accused was found guilty or most likely guilty, and relevant information regarding accomplices or specific details were missing. It was applied mainly against those suspected of Judaizing and Protestantism beginning in the 16th century, in other words, "enemies of the state", since said crimes were usually thought to be associated with a larger organized network of either espionage or conspiracy with foreign powers. For example, Lea estimates that between 1575 and 1610 the court of Toledo tortured approximately a third of those processed for Protestant heresy. The recently opened Vatican Archives suggest even lower numbers.Messori, Vittorio (2000). Leyendas Negras de la Iglesia. Editorial Planeta (this source is a Catholic apologist) In other periods, the proportions varied remarkably. Torture was always a means to obtain the confession of the accused, not a punishment itself.

 Torture 

Torture was employed in all civil and religious trials in Europe. The Spanish Inquisition used it more restrictively than was common at the time. Its main differentiation characteristic was that, as opposed to both civil trials and other inquisitions, it had very strict regulations regarding when, what, to whom, how many times, for how long and under what supervision it could be applied.Haliczer, Stephen, Inquisition and society in the kingdom of Valencia, 1478–1834, p. 79, University of California Press, 1990 The Spanish inquisition engaged in it far less often and with greater care than other courts.by Peters, Edward, Inquisition, Dissent, Heterodoxy and the Medieval Inquisitional Office, pp. 92–93, University of California Press (1989), . In the civil court, both Spanish and otherwise, there was no restriction regarding duration or any other point.

 When: Torture was allowed only: "when sufficient proofs to confirm the culpability of the accused have been gathered by other means, and every other method of negotiation have been tried and exhausted". It was stated by the inquisitorial rule that information obtained through torment was not reliable, and confession should only be extracted this way when all needed information was already known and proven. Confessions obtained through torture could not be used to convict or sentence anyone.
 What: The Spanish Inquisition was prohibited to "maim, mutilate, draw blood or cause any sort of permanent damage" to the prisoner. Ecclesiastical tribunals were prohibited by church law from shedding blood. There was a closed list of the allowed torture methods. These were all tried and used in the civil courts all through Europe, and therefore known to be "safe" in this regard. Any other method, regardless of whether it was legal in the country or practiced in civil courts, was not allowed.
 How many times: Each accusation allowed for a different number of torment sessions on the same person (once the "when" condition of the culpability being supported by the strong external evidence was fulfilled). The number was dependent on how "harmful to society" the crime was. Counterfeit currency allowed for a maximum of two. The most serious offences allowed for a maximum of eight.
 For how long: "Torment" could be applied for a maximum of 15 minutes. The Roman Inquisition allowed for 30 minutes.
 Supervision: A Physician was usually available in case of emergency. It was also required for a doctor to certify that the prisoner was healthy enough to go through the torment without suffering harm.

Per contrast, European civil trials from England to Italy and from Spain to Russia could use, and did use, torture without justification and for as long as they considered. So much so that there were serious tensions between the Inquisition and Philip III, since the Inquisitors complained that "those people sent to the prisons of the King blasphemed and accused themselves of heresy just to be sent under the Inquisitorial jurisdiction instead of the King's" and that was collapsing the Inquisition's tribunals. During the reign of Philip IV there were registered complaints of the Inquisitors about people who "Blasphemated, mostly in winter, just to be detained and fed inside the prison".

Despite some popular accounts, modern historians state that torture was only ever used to confirm information or a confession, not for punitive reasons.

Rafael Sabatinni states that among the methods of torture allowed, and common in other secular and ecclesiastical tribunals, were garrucha, toca and the potro, even though those claims contradict both the Inquisitorial law and the claims made by Kamen. The application of the garrucha, also known as the strappado, consisted of suspending the victim from the ceiling by the wrists, which are tied behind the back. Sometimes weights were tied to the ankles, with a series of lifts and drops, during which the arms and legs suffered violent pulls and were sometimes dislocated.

The use of the toca (cloth), also called interrogatorio mejorado del agua (enhanced water interrogation), is better documented. It consisted of forcing the victim to ingest water poured from a jar so that they had the impression of drowning. The potro, the rack, in which the limbs were slowly pulled apart, was thought to be the instrument of torture used most frequently.

The assertion that confessionem esse veram, non factam vi tormentorum (literally: '[a person's] confession is truth, not made by way of torture') sometimes follows a description of how, after torture had ended, the subject freely confessed to the offences. Thus confessions following torture were deemed to be made of the confessor's free will, and hence valid.

Once the process concluded, the inquisidores met with a representative of the bishop and with the consultores (consultants), experts in theology or Canon Law (but not necessarily clergy themselves), which was called the consulta de fe (faith consultation/religion check). The case was voted and sentence pronounced, which had to be unanimous. In case of discrepancies, the Suprema had to be informed.

 Sentencing 
The results of the trial could be the following:
 Although quite rare in actual practice, the defendant could be acquitted. Inquisitors did not wish to terminate the proceedings. If they did, and new evidence turned up later, they would be forced into reopening and re-presenting the old evidence.
 The trial could be suspended, in which case the defendant, although under suspicion, went free (with the threat that the process could be continued at any time) or was held in long-term imprisonment until a trial commenced. When set free after a suspended trial it was considered a form of acquittal without specifying that the accusation had been erroneous.
 The defendant could be penanced. Since they were considered guilty, they had to publicly abjure their crimes (de levi if it was a misdemeanor, and de vehementi if the crime were serious), and accept a public punishment. Among these were sanbenito, exile, fines or even sentencing to service as oarsmen in royal galleys.
 The defendant could be reconciled. In addition to the public ceremony in which the condemned was reconciled with the Catholic Church, more severe punishments were used, among them long sentences to jail or the galleys, plus the confiscation of all property. Physical punishments, such as whipping, were also used.
 The most serious punishment was relaxation''' to the secular arm. The Inquisition had no power to actually kill the convict or determine the way they should die; that was a right of the King. Burning at the stake was a possibility, probably kept from the Papal Inquisition of Aragon, but a very uncommon one. This penalty was frequently applied to impenitent heretics and those who had relapsed. Execution was public. If the condemned repented, they were shown mercy by being garroted before their corpse was burned; if not, they were burned alive.

Frequently, cases were judged in absentia, and when the accused died before the trial finished, the condemned were burned in effigy.

The distribution of the punishments varied considerably over time. It is believed that sentences of death were enforced in the first stages within the long history of the Inquisition. According to García Cárcel, the court of Valencia, one of the most active, employed the death penalty in 40% of the convicts before 1530, but later that percentage dropped to 3%. By the middle of the 16th century, inquisition courts viewed torture as unnecessary and death sentences had become rare.

 Auto-da-fé 

If the sentence was condemnatory, this implied that the condemned had to participate in the ceremony of an auto de fe (more commonly known in English as an auto-da-fé) that solemnized their return to the Church (in most cases), or punishment as an impenitent heretic. The autos-da-fé could be private (auto particular) or public (auto publico or auto general).

Although initially the public autos did not have any special solemnity nor sought a large attendance of spectators, with time they became solemn ceremonies, celebrated with large public crowds, amidst a festive atmosphere. The auto-da-fé eventually became a baroque spectacle, with staging meticulously calculated to cause the greatest effect among the spectators. The autos were conducted in a large public space (frequently in the largest plaza of the city), generally on holidays. The rituals related to the auto began the previous night (the "procession of the Green Cross") and sometimes lasted the whole day. The auto-da-fé frequently was taken to the canvas by painters: one of the better-known examples is the 1683 painting by Francisco Rizi, held by the Prado Museum in Madrid that represents the auto celebrated in the Plaza Mayor of Madrid on 30 June 1680. The last public auto-da-fé took place in 1691.

The auto-da-fé involved a Catholic Mass, prayer, a public procession of those found guilty, and a reading of their sentences. They took place in public squares or esplanades and lasted several hours; ecclesiastical and civil authorities attended. Artistic representations of the auto-da-fé usually depict torture and the burning at the stake. This type of activity never took place during an auto-da-fé, which was in essence a religious act. Torture was not administered after a trial concluded, and executions were always held after and separate from the auto-da-fé, though in the minds and experiences of observers and those undergoing the confession and execution, the separation of the two might be experienced as merely a technicality.

The first recorded auto-da-fé was held in Paris in 1242, during the reign of Louis IX. The first Spanish auto-da-fé did not take place until 1481 in Seville; six of the men and women subjected to this first religious ritual were later executed. The Inquisition had limited power in Portugal, having been established in 1536 and officially lasting until 1821, although its influence was much weakened with the government of the Marquis of Pombal in the second half of the 18th century. Autos-da-fé also took place in Mexico, Brazil and Peru: contemporary historians of the Conquistadors such as Bernal Díaz del Castillo record them. They also took place in the Portuguese colony of Goa, India, following the establishment of Inquisition there in 1562–1563.

The arrival of the Enlightenment in Spain slowed inquisitorial activity. In the first half of the 18th century, 111 were condemned to be burned in person, and 117 in effigy, most of them for judaizing. In the reign of Philip V, there were 125 autos-da-fé, while in the reigns of Charles III and Charles IV only 44.

During the 18th century, the Inquisition changed: Enlightenment ideas were the closest threat that had to be fought. The main figures of the Spanish Enlightenment were in favour of the abolition of the Inquisition, and many were processed by the Holy Office, among them Olavide, in 1776; Iriarte, in 1779; and Jovellanos, in 1796; Jovellanos sent a report to Charles IV in which he indicated the inefficiency of the Inquisition's courts and the ignorance of those who operated them: "... friars who take [the position] only to obtain gossip and exemption from the choir; who are ignorant of foreign languages, who only know a little scholastic theology."

In its new role, the Inquisition tried to accentuate its function of censoring publications but found that Charles III had secularized censorship procedures, and, on many occasions, the authorization of the Council of Castile hit the more intransigent position of the Inquisition. Since the Inquisition itself was an arm of the state, being within the Council of Castile, civil rather than ecclesiastical censorship usually prevailed. This loss of influence can also be explained because the foreign Enlightenment texts entered the peninsula through prominent members of the nobility or government, influential people with whom it was very difficult to interfere. Thus, for example, Diderot's Encyclopedia entered Spain thanks to special licenses granted by the king.

After the French Revolution the Council of Castile, fearing that revolutionary ideas would penetrate Spain's borders, decided to reactivate the Holy Office that was directly charged with the persecution of French works. An Inquisition edict of December 1789, that received the full approval of Charles IV and Floridablanca, stated that:

having news that several books have been scattered and promoted in these kingdoms... that, without being contented with the simple narration events of a seditious nature... seem to form a theoretical and practical code of independence from the legitimate powers.... destroying in this way the political and social order... the reading of thirty and nine French works is prohibited, under fine...

However, inquisitorial activity was impossible in the face of the information avalanche that crossed the border; in 1792, "the multitude of seditious papers... does not allow formalizing the files against those who introduce them".

The fight from within against the Inquisition was almost always clandestine. The first texts that questioned the Inquisition and praised the ideas of Voltaire or Montesquieu appeared in 1759. After the suspension of pre-publication censorship on the part of the Council of Castile in 1785, the newspaper El Censor began the publication of protests against the activities of the Holy Office by means of a rationalist critique. Valentin de Foronda published Espíritu de los Mejores Diarios, a plea in favour of freedom of expression that was avidly read in the salons. Also, in the same vein, Manuel de Aguirre wrote On Toleration in El Censor, El Correo de los Ciegos and El Diario de Madrid.

End of the Inquisition

During the reign of Charles IV of Spain (1788–1808), in spite of the fears that the French Revolution provoked, several events accelerated the decline of the Inquisition. The state stopped being a mere social organizer and began to worry about the well-being of the public. As a result, the land-holding power of the Church was reconsidered, in the señoríos and more generally in the accumulated wealth that had prevented social progress. The power of the throne increased, under which Enlightenment thinkers found better protection for their ideas. Manuel Godoy and Antonio Alcalá Galiano were openly hostile to an institution whose only role had been reduced to censorship and was the very embodiment of the Spanish Black Legend, internationally, and was not suitable to the political interests of the moment:

The Inquisition? Its old power no longer exists: the horrible authority that this bloodthirsty court had exerted in other times was reduced... the Holy Office had come to be a species of commission for book censorship, nothing more...

The Inquisition was first abolished during the domination of Napoleon and the reign of Joseph Bonaparte (1808–1812). In 1813, the liberal deputies of the Cortes of Cádiz also obtained its abolition, largely as a result of the Holy Office's condemnation of the popular revolt against French invasion. But the Inquisition was reconstituted when Ferdinand VII recovered the throne on 1 July 1814. Juan Antonio Llorente, who had been the Inquisition's general secretary in 1789, became a Bonapartist and published a critical history in 1817 from his French exile, based on his privileged access to its archives.

Possibly as a result of Llorente's criticisms, the Inquisition was once again temporarily abolished during the three-year Liberal interlude known as the Trienio liberal, but still the old system had not yet had its last gasp. Later, during the period known as the Ominous Decade, the Inquisition was not formally re-established, although, de facto, it returned under the so-called Congregation of the Meetings of Faith, tolerated in the dioceses by King Ferdinand. On 26 July 1826, the "Meetings of Faith" Congregation condemned and executed the school teacher Cayetano Ripoll, who thus became the last person known to be executed by the Inquisition.

On that day, Ripoll was hanged in Valencia, for having taught deist principles.  This execution occurred against the backdrop of a European-wide scandal concerning the despotic attitudes still prevailing in Spain. Finally, on 15 July 1834, the Spanish Inquisition was definitively abolished by a Royal Decree signed by regent Maria Christina of the Two Sicilies, Ferdinand VII's liberal widow, during the minority of Isabella II and with the approval of the President of the Cabinet Francisco Martínez de la Rosa.

The Alhambra Decree that had expelled the Jews was formally rescinded on 16 December 1968 by Spanish dictator Francisco Franco, after the Second Vatican Council rejected the idea that Jews are deicides.

The prohibitions, persecution and eventual Jewish mass emigration from Spain and Portugal probably had adverse effects on the development of the Spanish and the Portuguese economy. Jews and Non-Catholic Christians reportedly had substantially better numerical skills than the Catholic majority, which might be due to the Jewish religious doctrine, which focused strongly on education, for example because Torah-Reading was compulsory. Even when Jews were forced to quit their highly skilled urban occupations, their numeracy advantage persisted. However, during the inquisition, spillover-effects of these skills were rare because of forced separation and Jewish emigration, which was detrimental for economic development.

Outcomes

Confiscations
It is unknown exactly how much wealth was confiscated from converted Jews and others tried by the Inquisition. Wealth confiscated in one year of persecution in the small town of Guadaloupe paid the costs of building a royal residence. There are numerous records of the opinion of ordinary Spaniards of the time that "the Inquisition was devised simply to rob people". "They were burnt only for the money they had", a resident of Cuenca averred. "They burn only the well-off", said another. In 1504 an accused stated, "only the rich were burnt". In 1484 Catalina de Zamora was accused of asserting that "this Inquisition that the fathers are carrying out is as much for taking property from the conversos as for defending the faith. It is the goods that are the heretics." This saying passed into common usage in Spain. In 1524 a treasurer informed Charles V that his predecessor had received ten million ducats from the conversos, but the figure is unverified. In 1592 an inquisitor admitted that most of the fifty women he arrested were rich. In 1676, the Suprema claimed it had confiscated over 700,000 ducats for the royal treasury (which was paid money only after the Inquisition's own budget, amounting in one known case to only 5%). The property on Mallorca alone in 1678 was worth "well over 2,500,000 ducats".

Death tolls and sentenced

García Cárcel estimates that the total number prosecuted by the Inquisition throughout its history was approximately 150,000; applying the percentages of executions that appeared in the trials of 1560–1700—about 2%—the approximate total would be about 3,000 put to death. Nevertheless, some authors consider that the toll may have been higher, keeping in mind the data provided by Dedieu and García Cárcel for the tribunals of Toledo and Valencia, respectively, and estimate between 3,000 and 5,000 were executed. Other authors disagree and estimate a max death toll between 1% and 5%, (depending on the time span used) combining all the processes the inquisition carried, both religious and non-religious ones.Eire, Carlos M. N. Reformations: The Early Modern World 1450–1650. New Haven: Yale University Press, 2016 pp 640 In either case, this is significantly lower than the number of people executed exclusively for witchcraft in other parts of Europe during about the same time span as the Spanish Inquisition (estimated at c. 40,000–60,000).

Modern historians have begun to study the documentary records of the Inquisition. The archives of the Suprema, today held by the National Historical Archive of Spain (Archivo Histórico Nacional), conserves the annual relations of all processes between 1540 and 1700. This material provides information for approximately 44,674 judgments. These 44,674 cases include 826 executions in persona and 778 in effigie (i.e. an effigy was burned). This material is far from being complete—for example, the tribunal of Cuenca is entirely omitted, because no relaciones de causas from this tribunal have been found, and significant gaps concern some other tribunals (e.g., Valladolid). Many more cases not reported to the Suprema are known from the other sources (i.e., no relaciones de causas from Cuenca have been found, but its original records have been preserved), but were not included in Contreras-Henningsen's statistics for the methodological reasons. William Monter estimates 1000 executions between 1530 and 1630 and 250 between 1630 and 1730.

The archives of the Suprema only provide information about processes prior to 1560. To study the processes themselves, it is necessary to examine the archives of the local tribunals, the majority of which have been lost to the devastation of war, the ravages of time or other events. Some archives have survived including those of Toledo, where 12,000 were judged for offences related to heresy, mainly minor "blasphemy", and those of Valencia. These indicate that the Inquisition was most active in the period between 1480 and 1530 and that during this period the percentage condemned to death was much more significant than in the years that followed. Modern estimates show approximately 2,000 executions in persona in the whole of Spain up to 1530.

Statistics for the period 1540–1700
The statistics of Henningsen and Contreras are based entirely on relaciones de causas. The number of years for which cases are documented varies for different tribunals. Data for the Aragonese Secretariat are probably complete, some small lacunae may concern only Valencia and possibly Sardinia and Cartagena, but the numbers for Castilian Secretariat—except Canaries and Galicia—should be considered as minimal due to gaps in the documentation. In some cases it is remarked that the number does not concern the whole period 1540–1700.

Autos da fe between 1701 and 1746
Table of sentences pronounced in the public autos da fe in Spain (excluding tribunals in Sicily, Sardinia and Latin America) between 1701 and 1746:

Abuse of power
Author Toby Green notes that the great unchecked power given to inquisitors meant that they were "widely seen as above the law" and sometimes had motives for imprisoning and sometimes executing alleged offenders other than for the purpose of punishing religious nonconformity, mainly in Hispanoamerica and Iberoamerica.Archivo General de las Indias, Seville, Santa Fe 228, Expediente 63

Green quotes a complaint by historian Manuel Barrios about one Inquisitor, Diego Rodriguez Lucero, who in Cordoba in 1506 burned to death the husbands of two different women he then kept as mistresses. According to Barrios

the daughter of Diego Celemin was exceptionally beautiful, her parents and her husband did not want to give her to [Lucero], and so Lucero had the three of them burnt and now has a child by her, and he has kept for a long time in the alcazar as a mistress.

Defenders of the Inquisition discrediting with Green are many and seem to be the growing trend in current scholarship. These authors do not necessarily deny the abuses of power but classify them as politically instigated and comparable to those of any other law enforcement body of the period. Criticisms, usually indirect, have gone from the suspiciously sexual overtones or similarities of these accounts with unrelated older antisemitic accounts of kidnap and torture, to the clear proofs of control that the king had over the institution, to the sources used by Green, or just by reaching completely different conclusions.Juan Antonio Llorente: Historia crítica de la Inquisición en España (tomo IV, p. 183). Madrid: Hiperión, 1980.

The context of Hispano America, that Green refers to often, was different from the Iberian context studied for many of those authors, due to the distance from the immediate executive power of the King, and deserves to be examined separately. Among those who do, there are also discrediting voices regarding the nature and extent of the Inquisition's abuses.

 Long-term economic effects 
According to a 2021 study, "municipalities of Spain with a history of a stronger inquisitorial presence show lower economic performance, educational attainment, and trust today."

Historiography

How historians and commentators have viewed the Spanish Inquisition has changed over time and continues to be a source of controversy. Before and during the 19th-century historical interest focused on who was being persecuted. In the early and mid 20th century, historians examined the specifics of what happened and how it influenced Spanish history. In the later 20th and 21st century, historians have re-examined how severe the Inquisition really was, calling into question some of the assumptions made in earlier periods.

19th to early 20th century scholarship
Before the rise of professional historians in the 19th century, the Spanish Inquisition had largely been portrayed by Protestant scholars who saw it as the archetypal symbol of Catholic intolerance and ecclesiastical power. The Spanish Inquisition for them was largely associated with the persecution of Protestants, or inexplicably, of witches. William H. Prescott described the Inquisition as an "eye that never slumbered". Despite the existence of extensive documentation regarding the trials and procedures, and to the Inquisition's deep bureaucratization, none of these sources were studied outside of Spain, and Spanish scholars arguing against the predominant view were automatically dismissed. The 19th-century professional historians, including the Spanish scholar Amador de los Ríos, were the first to successfully challenge this perception in the international sphere and get foreign scholars to make eco of their discoveries. Said scholars would obtain international recognition and start a period of revision on the Black Legend of the Spanish Inquisition.

At the start of the 20th century Henry Charles Lea published the groundbreaking History of the Inquisition in Spain. This influential work describes the Spanish Inquisition as "an engine of immense power, constantly applied for the furtherance of obscurantism, the repression of thought, the exclusion of foreign ideas and the obstruction of progress." Lea documented the Inquisition's methods and modes of operation in no uncertain terms, calling it "theocratic absolutism" at its worst. In the context of the polarization between Protestants and Catholics during the second half of the 19th century, some of Lea's contemporaries, as well as most modern scholars thought Lea's work had an anti-Catholic bias.

Starting in the 1920s, Jewish scholars picked up where Lea's work left off. They published Yitzhak Baer's History of the Jews in Christian Spain, Cecil Roth's History of the Marranos and, after World War II, the work of Haim Beinart, who for the first time published trial transcripts of cases involving conversos.

Contemporary historians who subscribe to the idea that the image of the Inquisition in historiography has been systematically deformed by the Black Legend include Edward Peters, Philip Wayne Powell, William S. Maltby, Richard Kagan, Margaret R. Greer, Helen Rawlings, Ronnie Hsia, Lu Ann Homza, Stanley G. Payne, Andrea Donofrio, Irene Silverblatt, Christopher Schmidt-Nowara, Charles Gibson, and Joseph Pérez. Contemporary historians who support the traditional view and deny the existence of a Black Legend include Toby Green. Contemporary historians who partially accept an impact of the Black Legend but deny other aspects of the hypothesis it includes Henry Kamen, David Nirenberg and Karen Armstrong.

 Revision after 1960 

The works of Juderias in (1913) and other Spanish scholars prior to him were mostly ignored by international scholarship until 1960.

One of the first books to build on them and internationally challenge the classical view was The Spanish Inquisition (1965) by Henry Kamen. Kamen argued that the Inquisition was not nearly as cruel or as powerful as commonly believed. The book was very influential and largely responsible for subsequent studies in the 1970s to try to quantify (from archival records) the Inquisition's activities from 1480 to 1834. Those studies showed there was an initial burst of activity against conversos suspected of relapsing into Judaism, and a mid-16th century pursuit of Protestants, but the Inquisition served principally as a forum Spaniards occasionally used to humiliate and punish people they did not like: blasphemers, bigamists, foreigners and, in Aragon, homosexuals, and horse smugglers. Kamen went on to publish two more books in 1985 and 2006 that incorporated new findings, further supporting the view that the Inquisition was not as bad as once described by Lea and others. Along similar lines is Edward Peters's Inquisition (1988).

One of the most important works about the inquisition's relation to the Jewish conversos or New Christians is The Origins of the Inquisition in Fifteenth-Century Spain (1995/2002) by Benzion Netanyahu. It challenges the view that most conversos were actually practicing Judaism in secret and were persecuted for their crypto-Judaism. Rather, according to Netanyahu, the persecution was fundamentally racial, and was a matter of envy of their success in Spanish society. This view has been challenged multiple times, and with some reasonable divergences the majority of historians either align with religious causes or with merely cultural ones, with no significant racial element.

Challenging some of the claims of revisionist historians is Toby Green in Inquisition, the Reign of Fear, who calls the claim by revisionists that torture was only rarely applied by inquisitors, a "worrying error of fact".

Historian Thomas F. Madden has written about popular myths of the Inquisition.

In popular culture
Literature

The literature of the 18th century approaches the theme of the Inquisition from a critical point of view. In Candide by Voltaire, the Inquisition appears as the epitome of intolerance and arbitrary justice in Europe.

During the Romantic Period, the Gothic novel, which was primarily a genre developed in Protestant countries, frequently associated Catholicism with terror and repression. This vision of the Spanish Inquisition appears in, among other works, The Monk (1796) by Matthew Gregory Lewis (set in Madrid during the Inquisition, but can be seen as commenting on the French Revolution and the Terror); Melmoth the Wanderer (1820) by Charles Robert Maturin and The Manuscript Found in Saragossa by Polish author Jan Potocki.

The literature of the 19th century tends to focus on the element of torture employed by the Inquisition. In France, in the early 19th century, the epistolary novel Cornelia Bororquia, or the Victim of the Inquisition, which has been attributed to Spaniard Luiz Gutiérrez, and is based on the case of María de Bohórquez, ferociously criticizes the Inquisition and its representatives. The Inquisition also appears in one of the chapters of the novel The Brothers Karamazov (1880) by Fyodor Dostoevsky, which imagines an encounter between Jesus and the Inquisitor General. One of the best-known stories of Edgar Allan Poe, "The Pit and the Pendulum", explores the use of torture by the Inquisition.

The Inquisition also appears in 20th-century literature. La Gesta del Marrano, by the Argentine author Marcos Aguinis, portrays the length of the Inquisition's arm to reach people in Argentina during the 16th and 17th centuries. The first book in Les Daniels' "Don Sebastian Vampire Chronicles", The Black Castle (1978), is set in 15th-century Spain and includes both descriptions of Inquisitorial questioning and an auto-da-fé, as well as Tomás de Torquemada, who is featured in one chapter. The Marvel Comics series Marvel 1602 shows the Inquisition targeting Mutants for "blasphemy". The character Magneto also appears as the Grand Inquisitor. The Captain Alatriste novels by the Spanish writer Arturo Pérez-Reverte are set in the early 17th century. The second novel, Purity of Blood, has the narrator being tortured by the Inquisition and describes an auto-da-fé. Carme Riera's novella, published in 1994, Dins el Darrer Blau (In the Last Blue) is set during the repression of the chuetas (conversos from Majorca) at the end of the 17th century. In 1998, the Spanish writer Miguel Delibes published the historical novel The Heretic, about the Protestants of Valladolid and their repression by the Inquisition. Samuel Shellabarger's Captain from Castile deals directly with the Spanish Inquisition during the first part of the novel.

In the novel La Catedral del Mar by Ildefonso Falcones, published in 2006 and set in the 14th century, there are scenes of inquisition investigations in small towns and a great scene in Barcelona.

Film
 The 1947 epic Captain from Castile by Darryl F. Zanuck, starring Tyrone Power, uses the Inquisition as the major plot point of the film. It tells how powerful families used their evils to ruin their rivals. The first part of the film shows this and the reach of the Inquisition reoccurs throughout this movie following Pedro De Vargas (played by Power) even to the 'New World'.
 The Spanish Inquisition segment of the 1981 Mel Brooks movie The History of the World Part 1 is a comedic musical performance based on the activities of the first Inquisitor General of Spain, Tomás de Torquemada.
 The film The Fountain (2006), by Darren Aronofsky, features the Spanish Inquisition as part of a plot in 1500 when the Grand Inquisitor threatens Queen Isabella's life.
 Goya's Ghosts (2006) by Miloš Forman is set in Spain between 1792 and 1809 and focuses realistically on the role of the Inquisition and its end under Napoleon's rule.
 The film Assassin's Creed (2016) by Justin Kurzel, starring Michael Fassbender, is set in both modern times and Spain during the Inquisition. The film follows Callum Lynch (played by Fassbender) as he is forced to relive the memories of his ancestor, Aguilar de Nerha (also played by Fassbender), an Assassin during the Spanish Inquisition.
 The Pit and the Pendulum (Roger Corman, 1961).Akelarre (Pedro Olea, 1984), a film, about the Logroño trial of the Zugarramurdi witches.
Tomás de Torquemada is portrayed in 1492: The Conquest of Paradise (1992)

Theatre, music, television, and video games

 The Grand Inquisitor of Spain plays a part in Don Carlos (1867), a play by Friedrich Schiller (which was the basis for the opera Don Carlos in five acts by Giuseppe Verdi, in which the Inquisitor is also featured, and the third act is dedicated to an auto-da-fé).
 The 1965 musical Man of La Mancha depicts a fictionalized account of the author Miguel de Cervantes' run-in with Spanish authorities. The character of Cervantes produces a play-within-a-play of his unfinished manuscript, Don Quixote, while he awaits sentencing by the Inquisition.

 In the Monty Python comedy team's Spanish Inquisition sketches, an inept Inquisitor group repeatedly bursts into scenes after someone utters the words "I didn't expect to find a Spanish Inquisition", screaming "Nobody expects the Spanish Inquisition!" The Inquisition then uses ineffectual forms of torture, including a dish-drying rack, soft cushions and a comfy chair.
The Spanish Inquisition features as a main plotline element of the 2009 video game Assassin's Creed II: Discovery.
 The Universe of Warhammer 40,000 borrows several elements and concepts of the Catholic church Imaginarium, including the notion of the Black Legend's ideal of a fanatic Inquisitors, for some of its troops in Warhammer 40,000: Inquisitor – Martyr.
 The video game Blasphemous portrays a nightmarish version of the Spanish Inquisition, where the protagonist, named 'The Penitent one' wears a capirote (cone-shaped hat). The Penitent one battles twisted religious iconography and meets many characters attempting to atone for their sins along the way.

Contemporary politics
The Spanish Inquisition is a recurring trope that makes an occasional appearance in the British parliament, similar to calling something "nazi," to reject ideas seen as religiously authoritarian.

See also

 Notes and references 
 Explanatory notes 

 Citations 

 General and cited references 

 Revisionist books 

 Carroll, Warren H., Isabel: the Catholic Queen, Christendom Press (1991)

 Graizbord, David L. Souls in Dispute: Converso Identities in Iberia and the Jewish Diaspora, 1580–1700. Philadelphia: University of Pennsylvania Press 2004.
 Homza, Lu Ann, The Spanish Inquisition, 1478–1614, An Anthology of Sources, Hackett Publishing (2006)

 Kamen has published 4 editions under 3 titles: "First edition published 1965 ... as The Spanish Inquisition. Second edition published 1985 ... as Inquisition and Society in Spain. Third edition published 1998 ... as The Spanish Inquisition: A Historical Revision. Fourth edition 2014."
Kritzler, Edward, Jewish Pirates of the Caribbean. Anchor Books 2009. 
 Monter, William, Frontiers of Heresy: The Spanish Inquisition from the Basque Lands to Sicily, Cambridge University Press (1990)
  ch.5 "Revenge of the Savior: Jews and Power in Medieval Europe", ch.6 "The Extinction of Spain's Jews and the Birth of Its Inquisition"

 
 Rawlings, Helen, The Spanish Inquisition, Blackwell Publishing (2006)

 Seminal classical works 

 Henry Charles Lea, A History of the Inquisition of Spain (4 volumes), (New York and London, 1906–1907).
 
 Juan Antonio Llorente, "Historia crítica de la Inquisición de España"
 Ludwig von Pastor, History of the Popes from the Close of the Middle Ages; Drawn from the Secret Archives of the Vatican and other original sources, 40 vols. St. Louis, B.Herder 1898

 Old scholarship 

 Antonio Puigblanch, La Inquisición sin máscara (Cádiz, 1811–1813). [The Inquisition Unmasked (London, 1816)]
 William Thomas Walsh, Isabella of Spain (1930) and Characters of the Inquisition (1940). Both reprinted by TAN Books (1987).
 Rafael Sabatini, Torquemada and the Spanish Inquisition (1913)
 C. Roth, The Spanish Inquisition (1937)
 C. Roth, History of the Marranos (1932)
 A. S. Turberville, Medieval History and the Inquisition (1920)
 A.S. Turberville, The Spanish Inquisition (1932).
 Genaro García, La Inquisición de México (1906).
 Genaro Garcia, Autos de fe de la Inquisición de Mexico (1910)
 F. Garau, La Fee Triunfante (1691-reprinted 1931)
 J.T. Medina, Historia de la Inquisicion de Lima; de Chile; le la Plata; de Cartagena de las Indias; en las islas Filipinas (6 volumes), (1887–1899)
 V. Vignau, Catálogo... de la Inquisición de Toledo (1903)
 J. Baker, History of the Inquisition (1736)
 History of the Inquisition from its origin under Pope Innocent III till the present time. Also the private practices of the Inquisitors, the form of trial and modes of torture (1814)
 J. Marchant, A Review of the Bloody Tribunal (1770)
 E. N. Adler, Autos de fe and the Jew (1908)
 González de Montes, Discovery and Playne Declaration of Sundry Subtile Practices of the Holy Inquisition of Spayne Ludovico a Paramo, De Origine et Progressu Sanctae Inquisitionis (1598)
 J. M. Marín, Procedimientos de la Inquisición (2 volumes), (1886)
 I. de las Cagigas, Libro Verde de Aragon (1929)
 R. Cappa, La Inquisicion Espanola (1888)
 A. Paz y Mellia, Catálogo Abreviado de Papeles de Inquisición (1914)
 A.F.G. Bell, Luis de Leon (1925)
 M. Jouve, Torquemada (1935)
 Sir Alexander G. Cardew, A Short History of the Inquisition (1933)
 G. G. Coulton, The Inquisition (1929)
 Memoires Instructifs pour un Voyageur dans les Divers États de l'Europe (1738)
 Ramon de Vilana Perlas, La verdadera práctica apostólica de el S. Tribunal de la Inquisición (1735)
 H. B. Piazza, A Short and True Account of the Inquisition and its Proceeding (1722)
 A. L. Maycock, The Inquisition (1926)
 H. Nickerson, The Inquisition (1932)
 Conde de Castellano, Un Complot Terrorista en el Siglo XV; los Comienzos de la Inquisicion Aragonesa, (1927)
 Bernard Gui, Manuel de l'Inquisiteur, (1927)
 L. Tanon, Histoire des Tribunaux de l'Inquisition (1893)
 A. J. Texeira, Antonio Homem e a Inquisicao (1902)
 A. Baiao, A Inquisiçao em Portugal e no Brasil (1921)
 A. Herculano, Historia da Origem e Estabelecimento da Inquisiçao em Portugal (English translation, 1926)
 Joseph de Maistre, Letters on the Spanish Inquisition (1822, composed 1815):— late defence of the Inquisition
 Cornelius August Wilkens: Spanish Protestants in the Sixteenth Century (1897), 218p. read online at archive.org

 Other 

 
 Miranda Twiss, The Most Evil Men And Women In History (Michael O'Mara Books Ltd., 2002).
 Simon Whitechapel, Flesh Inferno: Atrocities of Torquemada and the Spanish Inquisition (Creation Books, 2003).

Further reading
 

External links

 "The Spanish Inquisition", BBC Radio 4 discussion with John Edwards, Alexander Murray & Michael Alpert (In Our Time'', 22 June 2006)
 Audio Lecture on the History of the Spanish Inquisition and 1492 Expulsion of Spanish Jewry

 
1478 establishments in Europe
15th-century establishments in Aragon
15th-century establishments in Castile
15th-century Islam
15th-century Judaism
16th-century anti-Protestantism
1834 disestablishments in Europe
Anti-Islam sentiment in Spain
Anti-Judaism
Antisemitism in Europe
Antisemitism in Spain
Catholicism-related controversies
Censorship in Spain
Early Modern Christian anti-Judaism
History of Catholicism in Spain
History of the Jews in Europe
Islam-related controversies in Europe
Islamophobia in Europe
Judaism-related controversies
Medieval Jewish history
Persecution of Jews
Persecution of LGBT people
Persecution of Muslims by Christians
Violence against Muslims
Violence in Spain